Jorge Mario Liderman (November 16, 1957 – February 3, 2008) was an Argentine-born American composer. He was awarded the Guggenheim Fellowship in 2003 to partially fund a new work for Duo46 titled Aires de Sefarad: 46 Spanish Songs for Violin and Guitar. Jorge went on to compose a second set of 46 songs for Duo46 titled Aires de Sefarad II shortly before his untimely death in 2008. He taught composition at the University of California, Berkeley.

Life 
Jorge Liderman was born in Buenos Aires, Argentina, in 1957. He studied at the Rubin School of Music in Jerusalem and earned a doctorate in composition from the University of Chicago in 1988. He joined the faculty of the University of California, Berkeley, in 1989.

He died February 3, 2008, in an apparent suicide, struck by an incoming train at the  Bay Area Rapid Transit (BART) station in El Cerrito.

Selected works

Orchestral 
Shir Eres (1984)
Song of Songs (2001), cantata for soprano, tenor, female chorus & chamber orchestra
Open Strings for guitar orchestra & electric bass

Operatic 
Antigona Furiosa (1991), libretto by the composer after the drama by Griselda Gambaro, performed at the third Munich Biennale

Chamber 
Aires de Sefarad (2004) - 46 Sephardic songs for Duo46, violin and guitar
Aires de Sefarad II (2007) - 46 Sephardic songs for Duo46, violin and guitar
Draft (1998) for piano, violin and tuned percussion
Furthermore. . . (2006) concerto for violin and chamber ensemble
Piano Quintet (2002)
Puncti, Belly, Etc., Etc... (1986)
String Quartet No. 1 (1985)
String Quartet No. 3 (1994)
Swirling Streams, for guitar, bass clarinet & string trio
That is already... for solo piano
Tropes IV (1994) for solo piano
Walking Dances for David Tanenbaum, guitar
Wind Up Toys for two pianos
Yzkor (1991)

Notes

External links 
 Jorge Liderman, Official Website
 obit at SF Classical Voice
 UCB press release
 Chronicle update

1957 births
2008 deaths
20th-century classical composers
21st-century classical composers
American male classical composers
American classical composers
Jewish American classical composers
Jewish Argentine musicians
Argentine emigrants to the United States
Argentine expatriates in Israel
Argentine Jews
People from Buenos Aires
Suicides in California
Suicides by train
Railway accident deaths in the United States
University of California, Berkeley College of Letters and Science faculty
University of Chicago alumni
21st-century American composers
20th-century American composers
20th-century American male musicians
21st-century American male musicians
2008 suicides
20th-century American Jews
21st-century American Jews